Ruth Alexandra Elisabeth Jones  (born 22 September 1966) is a Welsh actress, comedian, writer and producer. She co-wrote and co-starred in the award-winning BBC sitcom Gavin & Stacey (2007–2010, 2019). She later created, wrote for and starred in the Sky One Television in the United Kingdom|British]] comedy-drama Stella (2012-2017), for which she was nominated for the BAFTA Award for Best Female Comedy Performance and won the BAFTA Cymru Award for Best Screenwriter.

Jones has also appeared in various television series, including Fat Friends (2000–2005), Little Britain (2003–2007), Nighty Night (2004–2005), Saxondale (2006–2007) and The Street (2009). Jones was appointed Member of the Order of the British Empire (MBE) in the 2014 New Year Honours for services to entertainment.

Early life
Ruth Jones was born on 22 September 1966 in Bridgend, Glamorgan, Wales. Her father was a lawyer for British Steel Corporation, Port Talbot, and her mother was a general practitioner. She has two older brothers and a younger sister. Jones was brought up in Porthcawl, where she attended Porthcawl Comprehensive School, the same school as the actor and comedian Rob Brydon. At school, she participated enthusiastically every year in musical theatre productions. After graduating from the University of Warwick with a degree in Theatre Studies and Dramatic Arts, she trained at the Royal Welsh College of Music & Drama in Cardiff.

Career
In November 1989, Jones took her first professional role, with Dominic Cooke's company, Pan Optic, playing the Countess Almaviva in Cooke's adaptation of The Marriage of Figaro, which toured the UK for six months. After the tour finished she found it difficult to get acting work, temping as a clerical assistant in the Education Contracts department of the Kensington and Chelsea Borough Council. 

At that point, she considered giving up acting and training as a solicitor. However, in 1990, comedian and pantomime producer Stan Stennett offered her an Equity contract, shifting scenery and playing a Teenage Mutant Ninja Turtle (Michelangelo) in Dick Whittington at the Porthcawl Pavilion, where she had performed in school musicals. Her first television job was a non-broadcast sketch show for BBC Wales, which included Rob Brydon and Steve Speirs. Soon after, she joined an improv group in Bath. The group included Julia Davis, with whom Jones would later appear in Nighty Night and Gavin & Stacey.

She first worked in TV and radio comedy for BBC Wales in 1991. Theatre roles with the RSC and The National Theatre were followed by her performance in 1999 hit British film East Is East. In 1996, she appeared in the BBC television period drama Drover’s Gold, billed as a "Welsh Western", the story of a cattle drove that went from West Wales to London. Jones later commented, "I loved that job. I visited places like Lampeter and Llandeilo for the first time, as well as Abergavenny and Crickhowell. I fell in love with them all. There was something so unspoilt about them, and I’ve been back several times since."

Jones appeared on television as Kelly in four series of ITV's comedy Fat Friends. This was where she met James Corden. Afterwards she appeared in several BBC comedies, playing Myfanwy in Little Britain, Magz in Saxondale and Linda in  Nighty Night.
 
Jones achieved prominence in 2007 as both co-writer with James Corden of the BBC Three sitcom Gavin & Stacey, and playing a lead role in it as Nessa Jenkins. The series became a hit and was moved to BBC One. Jones said, "It wasn't as deliberate as us saying, 'Right, we're going to react against cynical comedy'. We just wrote what we wanted. And it just so happens that the show does generate a lot of warmth. People seem to like that, especially when things aren't terribly jolly. It's nice to have your cockles warmed." 

The series won several awards, including two BAFTAs and four British Comedy Awards. Jones and co-star Rob Brydon recorded "Islands in the Stream" (a song performed by their characters in the programme) as a single for Comic Relief in 2009; the song reached No. 1 in the chart.

In 2008, Jones featured in two BBC One television period costume dramas, Tess of the d'Urbervilles and Little Dorrit, as well as two episodes of The Street. In December 2009, she starred in A Child's Christmases in Wales. In 2010, she starred in BBC Four comedy The Great Outdoors alongside Mark Heap, and, in December, presented the first of four chat shows on BBC2, Ruth Jones' Christmas Cracker. In January 2011, she starred as Hattie Jacques in BBC Four drama Hattie, which recounts Jacques' affair with her young driver John Schofield while she was married to actor John Le Mesurier, later known for his role in Dad's Army.

In 2008, Jones co-founded Tidy Productions with producer David Peet. The company produced the series Jones presented on BBC Radio Wales in 2008-9, Ruth Jones' Sunday Brunch. In 2010, the company had comedy and light entertainment production credits with BBC Two and BBC Three. It has made two 90-minute comedy dramas for S4C and light-entertainment shows for BBC Wales, and topical radio series What's the Story? for Radio Wales, predecessor to The Leek.

Tidy Productions also produced 58 episodes of the comedy drama Stella for Sky TV. The first series aired in 2012. It was Jones' first major comedy project since Gavin & Stacey; she created, executive produced and storylined the show with Peet. Jones stars in the title role, and wrote several episodes as well as co-writing episodes with Rob Gittins, Rob Evans, David Peet and Steve Speirs. Jones has stated she was worried about comparisons to Gavin & Stacey when setting a second programme in Wales and the company originally thought to set it in Bristol, but the decision was made to set it in the Rhondda Valley "I know people from the Valleys and it is just a joyously colourful place and full of characters." A second series of Stella was filmed in summer 2012 and aired in early 2013. A further four series plus two Christmas specials completed the run, with the final episode broadcast in October 2017.

In January 2018, Jones took the part of Mandy Haveez in Radio Wales comedy series Splott, written by David Peet and made by Tidy Productions. In March 2018, Jones worked with director Debbie Issit, appearing in the film Nativity 4. In April 2018, Jones's first novel, "Never Greener", was published. Based on a screenplay she’d written in 2004, it tells the story of a rekindled affair and the dangers of taking second chances. She signed a two-book deal with Transworld after a bidding war between ten publishing companies. The novel went into the Sunday Times bestseller list at number 7 after just three days of sales, before reaching the number-one slot for two consecutive weeks. Jones' second novel, "Us Three", is due to be published in September 2020. It follows the story of three friends whose futures become unpredictable after an unexpected turn in events.

In October 2018, Jones returned to the stage after a 12-year absence in the new play "The Nightingales" by William Gaminara, produced by Jenny Topper and Theatre Royal, Bath.

An extra episode,  ('Language Road Trip: Christmas') was broadcast at the end of 2020, interviewing each of the celebrities about whether they were still making use of their Welsh and the opportunities they had had to use Welsh during lockdown.

Recognition and awards

Jones was judged the Best Female Comedy Newcomer at the 2007 British Comedy Awards, and was also nominated for Best Television Comedy Actress. She was also recipient of the Ultimate Funny Woman award at the annual Cosmopolitan Ultimate Women of the Year Awards in November 2009. In July 2013, Jones received an honorary degree from the University of Warwick. In November 2022, she was conferred the honorary degree of Doctor of the University of The Open University by The Open University in Wales, at the International Convention Centre Wales in Newport.

Jones was appointed Member of the Order of the British Empire (MBE) in the 2014 New Year Honours for services to entertainment.

Jones was awarded the BAFTA Cymru Sian Phillips Special Recognition Award in 2009. In 2012, Jones received a nomination for the British Academy Television Award for Best Female Comedy Performance for her performance in Stella.

Personal life
Jones married David Peet, the TV and radio producer, in 1999. Jones is step-mother to three children from Peet's previous marriage.

In 2010, Jones took part in Channel 4's Comedy Gala, a benefit show held in aid of Great Ormond Street Children's Hospital, filmed live at the O2 Arena in London on 30 March.

In January 2019 Jones was the guest for BBC Radio 4's Desert Island Discs. Her favourite music track was "Smooth" by Santana featuring Rob Thomas. Her choice of Bible was a family Welsh Bible, her own book choice was Halliwell's Film Guide and her luxury item was the back catalogue of The Archers.

Filmography

Films

TV

Guest appearances

Writing

Books

Production
Gavin & Stacey (Series 1, 6 episodes: BBC3 and BBC2 2007)
Gavin & Stacey (Series 2, 7 episodes: BBC3 2008)
Gavin & Stacey (Christmas Special: December 2008)
Gavin & Stacey (Series 3, 6 episodes: BBC1 2009,2010)
Ar Y Tracs Exec. Producer Tidy Productions S4C 2009)

Music
Islands in the Stream (cover version for Comic Relief)

References

External links
 

1966 births
Living people
People from Porthcawl
People educated at Porthcawl Comprehensive School
Alumni of the University of Warwick
Alumni of the Royal Welsh College of Music & Drama
Welsh film actresses
Welsh television actresses
Welsh television writers
Welsh comedy writers
Members of the Order of the British Empire
21st-century Welsh comedians
British women television writers
21st-century British screenwriters